Dayville School is a public school in Dayville, Oregon, United States. It is the only school in the Dayville School District.

Academics
In 2008, 100% of the school's seniors received a high school diploma. Of seven students, seven graduated and none dropped out.

There are 18 people on staff at the school: the principal, six teachers, three aides, five support staff, a bus driver and a cook.

References

High schools in Grant County, Oregon
Public high schools in Oregon
Public middle schools in Oregon
Public elementary schools in Oregon